Caryomene is a genus of flowering plants belonging to the family Menispermaceae.

Its native range is Southern Tropical America.

Species:

Caryomene foveolata 
Caryomene glaucescens 
Caryomene grandifolia 
Caryomene olivascens 
Caryomene prumnoides

References

Menispermaceae
Menispermaceae genera